Poor Devil may represent:
 Poor Devil (1940 film), starring Fernando Soler
 Poor Devil (1973 film), starring Sammy Davis Jr.
 Poor Devil (2023 TV series)